Globočica is a South toponym that may refer to:

Globočica, Dragaš, a settlement in the Dragaš region of Kosovo - see List of populated places in the municipality of Dragaš, Kosovo#Globočica
Globočice pri Kostanjevici, named Globočica in some of the older sources